Tovah Khoshkeh (also known as Towoshkeh, Tū Khoshkeh, and Tūvashkeh) is a village in Jeygaran Rural District, Ozgoleh District, Salas-e Babajani County, Kermanshah Province, Iran. At the 2006 census, its population was 70, in 13 families.

References 

Populated places in Salas-e Babajani County